Laura Buckley (1977–2022) was an Irish video and installation artist, and sculptor. Born in Galway, Ireland, she lived and worked in London. She exhibited throughout the UK and internationally.

Early life and education 
Buckley was born in County Galway, Ireland and lived in a small town. After graduating from NCAD in Dublin in 2000, she received her MA from Chelsea College of Art and Design in London in 2007.

Work 

Buckley worked in various digital and video medias including "moving image, kinetics, sound, light, sculpture and digital print". She described to Bomb magazine in 2014 that she had stopped painting and started "painting with light". She hoped her work made people feel: "A connection. Less alone." A Frieze review described her installations as containing eclectic sources "that provided the intricate layers for Buckley’s sound, video and sculptural installations."

Career 
Fata Morgana was a "dazzling and disorientating large-scale", walk-in, kaleidoscope installation Buckley made for Cell Project Space in 2012. It was shown again in 2019 for a group exhibition titled Kaleidoscope at Saatchi Gallery.

Buckley exhibited at Mother's Tankstation in Dublin in 2010, and was part of Into Boundless Space I Leap, an exhibition based on the work of Scottish scientist James Clerk Maxwell at the University of Cambridge in 2016. She also exhibited at Art House – an illegally constructed 'beach house' on a roof in Hackney – in 2016. She collaborated with many artists in exhibitions and performances including Kim Coleman at Block 336 (2016), Paul Purgas at the Whitechapel Gallery (2015), Dan Coopey at Turner Contemporary (2013), and with Dave MacLean and Haroon Mirza at Rokeby (2009).

Her work is in the Zabludowicz Collection.

References

External links 
 Obituary in Art Review
 Interview with artist

1977 births
2022 deaths
21st-century Irish women artists
Alumni of Chelsea College of Arts
Alumni of the National College of Art and Design
Irish contemporary artists
People from County Galway
Women installation artists
Women video artists